The Beauty of Letting Go is the fourth and final studio album released by American rock band Socialburn.

Track listing
"Be a Man" - 4:13
"Touch the Sky" - 3:58
"Cold Night" - 4:19
"Get Out Alive" - 3:26
"Speak Now" - 4:21
"Ride" - 4:06
"Paranoid" - 3:07
"Leaving Song" - 4:24
"Who Cares" - 4:12
"Love Hate" - 3:45
"Out to Sea" - 4:31
"I'm Happy" - 4:32

References

2005 albums
Socialburn albums
Albums produced by James Paul Wisner